Tilt (known as Thunder Storm in Japan) is the second solo album by English drummer Cozy Powell, released in 1981.

Track listing

Side one
"The Right Side" (Kirby Gregory, John Cook) – 3:50
"Jekyll & Hyde" (Gregory, Cook) – 4:38
"Sooner or Later" (Gregory, Elmer Gantry) – 3:02
"Living a Lie" (Cozy Powell, Bernie Marsden, Don Airey) – 5:37

Side two
"Cat Moves" (Jan Hammer) – 5:12
"Sunset" (Gary Moore) – 4:32
"The Blister" (Moore, Airey) – 4:22
"Hot Rock" (Hammer) – 4:36

CD release
 "Cat Moves" (Hammer) - 5:10
 "Sunset" (Moore) - 4:29
 "Living a Lie" (Powell, Marsden, Airey) - 5:34
 "Hot Rock" (Hammer) - 4:36
 "The Blister" (Moore, Airey) - 4:21
 "The Right Side" (Gregory, Cook) - 3:49
 "Jekyll & Hyde" (Gregory, Cook) - 4:36
 "Sooner or Later" (Gregory, Gantry) - 3:00

Personnel
Cozy Powell – drums
Elmer Gantry – lead vocals on "Right Side", "Jekyll & Hyde" and "Sooner or Later"
Frank Aiello – lead vocals on "Living a Lie"
Kirby Gregory – guitar on "Right Side", "Jekyll & Hyde" and "Sooner or Later"
Bernie Marsden – guitar on "Living a Lie"
Jeff Beck – guitar on "Cat Moves" and "Hot Rock"
Gary Moore – guitar on "Sunset" and "The Blister"
Chris Glen – bass guitar on "Right Side", "Jekyll & Hyde" & "Sooner or Later"
Neil Murray – bass guitar on "Living a Lie"
Jack Bruce – bass guitar on "Cat Moves"
John Cook – keyboards, Moog Taurus on "The Blister" and "Hot Rock"
Don Airey – keyboards on "Sunset" and "The Blister"
Mel Collins – saxophone on "The Right Side"
David Sancious – synthesiser on "Cat Moves"

1981 albums
Polydor Records albums
Cozy Powell albums
Albums with cover art by Hipgnosis
Jazz fusion albums by English artists